According to the Bible, Medan ( Məḏān "contention; to twist, conflict"); also spelt Madan was the third son of Abraham, the patriarch of the Israelites, and Keturah whom he wed after the death of Sarah.  Medan had five brothers, Zimran, Jokshan, Midian, Ishbak, and Shuah.

Josephus tells us that "Abraham contrived to settle them in colonies; and they took possession of Troglodytis and the country of Arabia Felix (Arabia the Happy), as far as it reaches to the Red Sea." Little else is known about him.

There is no known connection to the Madan people of Iran and Iraq.

References

Book of Genesis people
Children of Abraham